Environmental issues are disruptions in the usual function of ecosystems.  Further, these issues can be caused by humans or they can be natural. These issues are considered serious when the ecosystem cannot recover in the present situation, and catastrophic if the ecosystem is projected to certainly collapse. 

Environmental protection is the practice of protecting the natural environment on the individual, organizational or governmental levels, for the benefit of both the environment and humans. Environmentalism is a social and environmental movement that addresses environmental issues through advocacy, legislation education, and activism.

Environment destruction caused by humans is a global, ongoing problem. Water pollution also cause problems to marine life. Most scholars think that the project peak global world population of between 9-10 billion people, could live sustainably within the earth's ecosystems if human society worked to live sustainably within planetary boundaries. The bulk of environmental impacts are caused by the most wealthy populations in the globe consuming too much industrial goods. The UN Environmental Program, in its "Making Peace With Nature" Report in 2021, found addressing key planetary crises, like pollution, climate change and biodiversity loss, was achievable if parties work to address the Sustainable Development Goals.

Types

Major current environmental issues may include climate change, pollution, environmental degradation, and resource depletion. The conservation movement lobbies for protection of endangered species and protection of any ecologically valuable natural areas, genetically modified foods and global warming. The UN system has adopted international frameworks for environmental issues in three key issues, which has been encoded as the "triple planetary crises": climate change, pollution, and biodiversity loss.

Impact

Conflict

Costs

Action

Justice

Law

Movement

Organizations 

Environmental issues are addressed at a regional, national or international level by government organizations.

The largest international agency, set up in 1972, is the United Nations Environment Programme. The International Union for Conservation of Nature brings together 83 states, 108 government agencies, 766 Non-governmental organizations and 81 international organizations and about 10,000 experts, scientists from countries around the world. International non-governmental organizations include Greenpeace, Friends of the Earth and World Wide Fund for Nature. Governments enact environmental policy and enforce environmental law and this is done to differing degrees around the world.

Film and television

There are an increasing number of films being produced on environmental issues, especially on climate change and global warming. Al Gore's 2006 film An Inconvenient Truth gained commercial success and a high media profile.

See also
Citizen science
Ecotax
Environmental impact statement
Index of environmental articles

Issues
List of environmental issues (includes mitigation and conservation)

Specific issues

Environmental impact of agriculture
Environmental impact of aviation
Environmental impact of reservoirs
Environmental impact of the energy industry
Environmental impact of fishing
Environmental impact of irrigation
Environmental impact of mining
Environmental impact of paint
Environmental impact of paper
Environmental impact of pesticides
Environmental implications of nanotechnology
Environmental impact of shipping
Environmental impact of war

References

External links

 
Human impact on the environment